Dastjordeh may refer to:
 Dastjordeh-ye Olya
 Dastjordeh-ye Sofla

See also
Dastjerdeh (disambiguation)